Bonaventura Peeters the Younger (Antwerp, 17 October 1648 – Antwerp, 2 September 1702), was a Flemish painter, draughtsman and sailor known for his marine and landscape paintings. He was a member of the Peeters family of artists which was active in Antwerp in the 17th century.

Life

He was born in Antwerp as the son of Gillis Peeters and Elisabeth de Smidt.  He was a scion of a family of painters specialised mainly in marine and landscape art.  His father and his uncle Bonaventura Peeters the Elder were marine painters and his brothers Willem (Gilliam) and Gillis the Younger were also marine artists.

There is a record of a Bonaventure Peeters registering as a pupil of the genre painter Hendrick Govaerts at the Antwerp Guild of Saint Luke in the Guild year 1700–1701. It is not clear whether this was Bonaventura the Younger as he was already 52 years old then.  He most likely trained in the family workshop.

A notarial act dated 8 October 1681 references a voyage by Bonaventura on the Dutch ship 'De Leeuw', which was part of the fleet sailing to Messina. He died in Antwerp where he was buried on 2 September 1702.

Work
Bonaventura the Younger is mainly known as a marine artist, although he also painted landscapes. Very few of his works have been identified.  His works are mainly marines with ships at sea or in harbours.

His only known landscape painting is a Forest view painted in 1689 (Royal Museum of Fine Arts Antwerp).  It depicts a wooded area in the foreground in which a man is walking his dogs while in the background it shows a river with two boats from which fishermen are casting their nets.  The work is reminiscent of some of the works of the Sonian forest painters, a name given to the painters active in Brussels in the 17th century who often depicted the forests around Brussels.

A series of topographical drawings have been attributed to different members of the Peeters family, some of which also to Bonavantura the Younger and his father Gillis. There is a series of 6 drawings of southern ports in the collections of the Pushkin Museum and the Hermitage Museum, which are attributed to either Bonaventura or his father.  This includes the View of a southern harbour (Pushkin Museum).

References

External links

Flemish Baroque painters
Flemish marine artists
Flemish landscape painters
Painters from Antwerp
Flemish printmakers
Artists from Antwerp
1648 births
1702 deaths